Angarika Chaturth (अंगारिका चतुर्थी) is a Sankashti Chaturthi falling on Tuesday. It is considered highly auspicious among all Sankashti Chaturthi days.

Sankashti Chaturthi (संकष्टी चतुर्थी), also known as Sankatahara Chaturthi, is an auspicious day dedicated to Lord Ganesha. This day is celebrated in every lunar Hindu calendar month on the fourth day of the Krishna Paksha (the dark lunar phase or the waning fortnight of the moon).

History
According to Hindu teachings, Angarak, the son of Mother Earth and Bharadwaj Rishi, was an accomplished rishi and a great devotee of Lord Ganesha. He worshipped Lord Ganesha and sought his blessings. On Magh Krishna Chaturthi (a Tuesday), Lord Ganesha blessed him and asked him for a wish. Angarak expressed that his only wish was to be associated with Lord Ganesha’s name forever. The Lord granted his wish and proclaimed that whoever worships Lord Ganesha on Angarika Chaturthi will be granted all that he/she prays for. From that day onwards, Magh Krishna Chaturthi came to be known as Angarak Chaturthi.

Details
On the day of Angarika Sankashti Chaturthi, the devotees observe a strict fast from morning till evening. They break the fast at night after having a darshan/auspicious sighting of the moon, preceded by prayers and a pooja for Lord Ganesha. The Angarika Chaturthi (angarak in Sanskrit means red like burning coal embers) devotees believe their wishes will be fulfilled if they pray on this auspicious day. The fast of Sankashti Chaturthi is generally started from the day "Angarika Sankashti Chaturthi". Also Angarika Sankashti means deliverance during troubled times, hence observing this fast is believed to reduce a person's problems, as Lord Ganesha is the remover of all obstacles and the supreme lord of intelligence. Before moonlight, the Ganapati Atharvashesha is recited to summon the blessings of Lord Ganesha.

Legend

Note: this is only one version of the story in which Ganesha gets his famous elephant head. The other, better-known version of this legend is completely different- it involves Shiva beheading a much older Ganesha and differs in many other ways as well.

Part 1: Sage Durvasa and Lord Indra’s meeting

Once, Sage Durvasa was travelling from Vaikuntha to Kailasa. He came upon Lord Indra, who was spending time with the apsara Rambha. Lord Indra bowed before Sage Durvasa in reverence, and Sage Durvasa, who was pleased, handed him a Parijata flower, and spoke the following words:

“O Indra, this is a flower given by the lord which removes all the obstructions and the person whose head it will be placed will be victorious all around. He will be adored by the people first of all and will be the foremost of all gods. Mahalakshmi will not part company from him and follow him like a shadow. He will equate himself with Vishnu in knowledge, wisdom, prowess. He will be more powerful than all gods and will be valorous like Vishnu.”

Sage Durvasa left after this, and Lord Indra, still intoxicated by the presence of Rambha, placed the flower on the head of his elephant. The elephant thus got all the qualities that were ordained by the flower. The elephant then fought and defeated all other elephants and left Lord Indra. Thus destiny resulted in the elephant getting all the advantages associated with the blessings of the Parijata flower. If Indra had accepted the flower, he would have got all its qualities. But destiny, which was also a play of Vishnu, had other plans, and it waited for the birth of Ganesha.

Part 2: Lord Shani visits Kailasa on the occasion of Ganesha’s birth

The second part of this story is the occasion of the birth of Lord Ganesha and the conversation between Devi Parvati and Lord Shani.

On the birth of Lord Ganesha, all the other gods visited Kailasa to see him and bless him. Lord Shani also came to Kailasa and requested Lady Parvati to let him see Lord Ganesha. She granted him permission, and Lord Shani stood there, casting his gaze downwards. He did not look at the child and was satisfied with just standing near Lord Ganesha.

Lady Parvati enquired about the reason why he wasn’t looking at Lord Ganesha, and Lord Shani replied with the following: 

"O chaste lady, all the people have to face the results of their deeds. Whatever good or bad deeds are done, they cannot be washed away even after completion of crores of kalpas. The jiva is born as Brahma, Indra and Surya because of his deeds, and he is reborn as an animal because of his deeds."

"One achieves hell because of his deeds and also heaven because of his deeds. He becomes a great king because of his own deeds and an ordinary servant because of his own deeds. He is born beautiful because of his own deeds, and he becomes sick the same way. O mother, because of his own deeds, he indulges in vices, and by his own deeds, he becomes detached from the world."

"The people become rich because of their own deeds, and it is due to their own deeds that they become paupers. One gets a loving family because of his own deeds, and one gets a bad family because of his own deeds. Because of his own deeds, one gets the best spouse and kids, and because of his own deeds, he remains unmarried, or gets a wicked spouse or remains childless.

O beloved of Shiva, I will tell you a secret story. In my childhood, I was a great devotee of Lord Krishna, and I was always devoted to him. I always recited his name. My father married me to the daughter of Citraratha, but I was always devoted to tapas. Once, when I was engrossed in meditation on Lord Krishna, she came to me seeking attention. I was unaware of her presence, being engrossed in meditation, and hence, I kept on performing tapas. She became annoyed and pronounced a curse in anger that whatever I cast my glance on would be destroyed. Thereafter after getting out of meditation, I calmed her and she repented.

O mother, because of the curse, I cannot cast my gaze at anything, and in order to save creatures from destruction, I always cast my glance downwards."

On hearing the words of Lord Shani, Lady Parvati laughed, and all the goddesses present also laughed.

Lady Parvati replied, "The entire universe moves according to the wishes of the Lord, more than the moves of destiny. You look at me and my child."

Lord Shani was in a fix whether to look at the son of Parvati or not; he did not want to offend Lady Parvati, and at the same time, he did not want to cause any unintended harm. Finally, so as not to offend Lady Parvati, he looked only at Lord Ganesha and not the Lady. His mind was disturbed, and his throat, lips and palate were dried up. With the corner of his right eye, he glanced at the child’s face.

At his gaze, the head of the child was cut off, and Lord Shani closed his eyes at once, looking downwards and stood there.

The severed head of the child went to Gokul and entered the body of Lord Krishna. Lady Parvati started lamenting and fainted. All the Gods and Goddesses panicked at this turn of events. Therefore, Lord Vishnu mounted on Garuda, went north, and reached the bank of the Puspabhadra river. There, he found Indra's elephant, who was all powerful by virtue of the flower given by Sage Durvasa. Lord Vishnu cut off the head of the elephant by using the Sudarshana chakra.

Lord Vishnu then brought the dead elephant back to life and returned him to Lord Indra. Lord Vishnu then lifted the elephant's head, which had been cut off and had special powers. He came back and joined the head of the elephant to the body of Lord Ganesha using his divine knowledge and brought the child back to life.

Understanding the story

The Brahmavaivarat Purana states that Lord Ganesha is an ansh (manifestation) of the supreme consciousness. It was destined for an ansh to manifest as remover of obstacles for men and gods, and he became the god of intellect and wisdom.

When we read the purana, we are amazed at how all incidents in the past come together and lead towards a chosen destiny. The flower was presented to Indra by Sage Durvasa, but it was not utilized by the king of the gods. The elephant temporarily benefited from the powers of the Parijata flower, but it was Lord Ganesha who was destined to be the foremost among gods and men and become known as the remover of obstacles. Thus, destiny worked in such a way that the attributes of the flower, which were accumulated by the austerities of Sage Durvasa, came to Lord Ganesha, and that is the reason he has an elephant head.

References

Hindu holy days
Ganesha

Hindu festivals